Vigo Park is an unincorporated community in Swisher County, Texas, United States. It is located along FM 146 in northeastern Swisher County, approximately ten miles south of Wayside and 53 miles southeast of Amarillo. Vigo Park had about a population of 10 as of August 2018. According to the Handbook of Texas, the community had an estimated population of 31 in 2000.

Geology 

An interstadial (a warmer period during a glaciation) dated 15,000 BC - penultimate interstadial of the Würm glaciation - was identified in Vigo Park and bears its name.

References

External links

Unincorporated communities in Swisher County, Texas
Unincorporated communities in Texas